A Code Academy or Coding Academy is a coding bootcamp, a set of intensive classes focusing on computer programming training.

Code Academy  or Coding Academy may also refer to: 

Codecademy, an online platform that offers programming classes